Robert Louis Backlund (born August 14, 1949) is an American retired amateur and professional wrestler. He is best known for his appearances in the World Wide Wrestling Federation/World Wrestling Federation from 1976 to 1984 and in the 1990s, where he held the WWWF Championship/WWF Championship on two occasions. His first reign was the second longest in history as recognised by the WWE. (Backlund lost the title to Antonio Inoki in Japan in 1979 but regained the belt within a week, and the WWF never acknowledged the title change in the USA) Backlund was inducted into the WWE Hall of Fame in 2013.

Backlund began his career in amateur wrestling, competing for the North Dakota State University Bison from the late 1960s to early 1970s. He began training as a professional wrestler in 1973 under Eddie Sharkey and competed for the American Wrestling Association. He then wrestled for the National Wrestling Alliance and won the NWA Missouri Heavyweight Championship in 1976. Later that year he joined the World Wide Wrestling Federation, defeating Superstar Billy Graham for the WWWF Heavyweight Championship in 1978. He held the championship until 1983, where he lost it in a match against the Iron Sheik. Shortly after losing the title, Backlund left the WWF, but returned in 1992 and was in the 1993 Royal Rumble match for over an hour, a record held until the 2004 Royal Rumble. At the 1994 Survivor Series, Backlund won his second WWF Championship, defeating Bret Hart. He held the championship for three days, before losing it to Diesel at a house show in Madison Square Garden.

In addition to his time with the WWWF/WWF, Backlund has had success in Wrestling and Romance, Championship Wrestling from Florida, New Japan Pro-Wrestling and was inducted into the George Tragos/Lou Thesz Professional Wrestling Hall of Fame in 2016.

Early life 
Backlund was born in Princeton, Minnesota, in 1949. He is a graduate of Princeton High School, where he was a state finalist in wrestling. During his freshman year while at Waldorf College in Forest City, Iowa, Backlund was an All-American in both football and wrestling (finishing third). During his sophomore campaign, Backlund focused on wrestling and once again earned All-American honors ( and national runner-up). Backlund was an amateur wrestler at North Dakota State University, winning the Division II NCAA Championship at 190 pounds in 1971. In 1972 Backlund moved up to the heavyweight class and finished fifth at the NCAA DII Nationals.  He graduated from North Dakota State University with a degree in physical education.

Professional wrestling career

Early career (1973−1977) 
Backlund was trained for professional wrestling by renowned trainer Eddie Sharkey and made his debut for the American Wrestling Association (AWA) in 1973. Backlund's clean-cut look and technical approach made him a natural face, and he quickly got over with the fans. After leaving the AWA, Backlund traveled the United States, working for the National Wrestling Alliance in its various territories. In 1974, Backlund wrestled in Texas, for Dory Funk, Jr. and Terry Funk's Amarillo, Texas-based Western States Sports promotion. In March, he defeated Terry Funk for the NWA Western States Heavyweight Championship (the promotion's top title). Backlund held it for two months, before losing it to Karl Von Steiger in May.

In mid-1975, Backlund started working for Georgia Championship Wrestling (GCW). He teamed with Jerry Brisco to win the NWA Georgia Tag Team Championship from Toru Tanaka and Mr. Fuji in October 1975. They held the championship belts for two months before losing to Les Thornton and Tony Charles. In 1976, Backlund left Georgia for Championship Wrestling from Florida (CWF, NWA Florida). Here he teamed with Steve Keirn to defeat Bob Orton, Jr. and Bob Roop for the NWA Florida Tag Team Championship. Backlund and Keirn lost the title to The Hollywood Blonds (Buddy Roberts and Jerry Brown) in October 1976. While working for NWA Florida, Backlund also wrestled in St. Louis, Missouri, for Sam Muchnick's St. Louis Wrestling Club. He defeated Harley Race to win the NWA Missouri Heavyweight Championship on April 23, 1976, and he lost the title to Jack Brisco on November 26.

World Wide Wrestling Federation/World Wrestling Federation (1976–1984)

Road to the title and early successes (1976−1978) 

In late 1976, Backlund joined Vincent J. McMahon's World Wide Wrestling Federation. He was managed by "The Golden Boy" Arnold Skaaland. Less than four months into his WWWF run, Backlund received his first shot at the WWWF Heavyweight Championship against Superstar Billy Graham, but he lost by countout. Through 1977, Backlund received additional title shots at the champion, and his fortunes started to change; the two went to a double countout in one match, then Backlund defeated Graham, but by countout (the title can only change hands via pinfall or submission). On February 20, 1978, at Madison Square Garden, Backlund finally scored a pinfall victory over Graham and won the title, despite Graham's leg being on the rope during the pinfall.

Backlund's early challengers for the title included Spiros Arion, Mr. Fuji, Ivan Koloff, George "the Animal" Steele, and Ken Patera, and had his first high-profile title match in Japan, defending against Antonio Inoki. He also won a series of rematches against Graham, including an April 1978 steel cage match at Madison Square Garden.

Three days after winning the WWWF Heavyweight Championship, Backlund clashed with the NWA World Heavyweight champion Harley Race in a rare "WWWF vs. NWA" title match. Both titles were on the line, but neither changed hands as the two fought to a 60-minute time limit draw. Defending against other champions became a recurring theme in Backlund's run with the title. He faced the AWA World Heavyweight champion (Nick Bockwinkel) and two NWA World Heavyweight champions (Harley Race four times and Ric Flair once) He defeated the NWA Florida Heavyweight champion Don Muraco. In 1982, he battled "international champion" Billy Robinson to a 63-minute curfew draw in Montreal.

Early in his run, Backlund and Peter Maivia formed a successful tag team and challenged for the WWWF World Tag Team Championship,  held by the Yukon Lumberjacks. During a television taping in October 1978, Maivia turned on Backlund and attacked him and Skaaland. In the immediate aftermath, fans for the first time got to see another side of Backlund's personality: that of a raving, ranting maniac when angered or pushed hard enough; in the post-match interview, Backlund screamed to interviewer Vince McMahon that he was going to "kill that son of a bitch!" Backlund eventually won a series of matches against Maivia, including a steel cage match in January 1979 at Madison Square Garden, although he was not able to fulfill his threat to end the life of Maivia.
In 1979, the World Wide Wrestling Federation (WWWF) became the World Wrestling Federation (WWF). On November 30, 1979, NWF Heavyweight champion Antonio Inoki defeated Backlund in Tokushima, Japan to win the WWF title. Backlund then won a rematch on December 6. However, WWF president Hisashi Shinma declared the re-match a no contest due to interference from Tiger Jeet Singh, and Inoki remained champion. Inoki refused the title on the same day, and it was declared vacant. Backlund later defeated Bobby Duncum in a Texas death match to regain the title on December 17. Inoki's reign is not recognized by WWE in its WWF/WWE title history.

On August 9, 1980, Backlund teamed with Pedro Morales to capture the WWF Tag Team Championship from the Wild Samoans at Showdown at Shea. Backlund and Morales were forced to vacate the title due to a then-extant WWF rule stating that no one can hold two championships at the same time. Backlund had more tag team success when he (along with Antonio Inoki) won the "1980 MSG Tag Team League Tournament", last defeating Hulk Hogan and Stan Hansen on December 10 in Osaka, Japan. Backlund and Inoki finished the tournament with seven wins and two double-countout decisions.

Also during 1980, Backlund and Hogan met in a series of highly publicized matches; although he scored several countout victories over Hogan, Backlund never was able to score a decisive victory over his charismatic young challenger, and Hogan – showing flashes of his future superstardom – proved to be one of Backlund's toughest opponents. Backlund was also able to overcome a challenge from Ken Patera, with whom he feuded on-and-off from 1978 until early 1981, including during Patera's reign as WWF Intercontinental Heavyweight champion.

Early 1980s: continued success 

Backlund's WWF Heavyweight Championship was held up after a match in New York City against Greg "the Hammer" Valentine on October 19, 1981, after a dazed referee "accidentally" gave the championship belt to Valentine as part of the storyline, it constituted an interruption of Backlund's title reign. However, Backlund was billed as the WWF Heavyweight champion in other cities in the days following the controversy. In the early part of the 1980s, when no promotion held nationally televised events, it was not uncommon practice to "hold up" the title in one area (to build interest in a rematch the "former" champion would win) while ignoring the situation in other parts of the territory. On November 23, Backlund pinned Valentine for the "vacant in New York only" WWF Heavyweight Championship. A rematch for the title, held inside a steel cage at the Philadelphia Spectrum in January 1982, also saw Backlund emerge the winner, securing the victory when he hit a piledriver on Valentine onto the mat. Even with the title being held up against Inoki and Valentine, Backlund is recognized by WWE as having one continuous title reign from 1978 to 1983 as WWE champion.

Backlund continued to be successful into 1982 and 1983, successfully defending against a variety of contenders, ranging from Adrian Adonis, "Cowboy" Bob Orton, Big John Studd, Ivan Koloff, Magnificent Muraco and Sgt. Slaughter. One of his most memorable encounters came in mid-1982, when he won a steel cage match against "Superfly" Jimmy Snuka; in that match, at Madison Square Garden, Snuka scaled the top of the cage, intending to perform his "Superfly" splash onto a prone Backlund to incapacitate him, but Backlund moved after Snuka began to fly through the air and went on to escape the cage. He also turned back a challenge from Superstar Billy Graham, who returned to the WWF in late 1982 wanting to reclaim the championship.

End of an era 
After having been popular with the fans from early on, in the final months of his title reign, Backlund changed his image, cutting his mop hair into a crew cut, wearing amateur wrestling singlets and losing muscle mass and definition. Fans seemingly grew weary of this "Howdy Doody" character (as the Grand Wizard had dubbed him). In 1983, he was voted the Wrestling Observer Newsletters Most Overrated Wrestler. Vince McMahon, who had bought the WWF from his father, wanted to put the title on the more charismatic and muscular Hulk Hogan. McMahon initially suggested Backlund to turn heel and lose to Hogan, but when Backlund refused, a transitional champion became necessary between Backlund and Hogan. Backlund sustained a (kayfabe) arm injury when the Iron Sheik assaulted him with his Persian clubs and on December 26, 1983, Backlund lost the title to the Sheik when Backlund's manager, Arnold Skaaland, threw in the towel while Backlund was locked in the camel clutch.

Due to Backlund's injury, Hogan took over Backlund's rematch and became the new WWF World Heavyweight Champion. The injury was a television story only; Backlund wrestled the Iron Sheik at least three times for the title at house shows (including once at the Boston Garden, winning by disqualification), and also wrestled the Magnificent Muraco for the Intercontinental Heavyweight Championship, also at a non-televised house show.

Backlund continued to work for the WWF for a while after the title change, but did not receive another title shot for the WWF World Heavyweight Championship after Hogan's victory. On August 4, 1984, Backlund defeated Salvatore Bellomo in his last WWF match for eight years.

 After the WWF and semi-retirement (1984–1992) 
After leaving the WWF, Backlund had a run in the short-lived Pro Wrestling USA, a joint promotion of the NWA and the AWA, meant to combat the national expansion of the WWF. In Pro Wrestling USA, Backlund unsuccessfully challenged AWA World Heavyweight champion Rick Martel. He soon dropped out of the pro wrestling scene in 1985, but he made a surprise return in 1991 for Herb Abrams' short-lived Universal Wrestling Federation (UWF). At Beach Brawl (the UWF's only pay-per-view event), he defeated Ivan Koloff. Backlund also wrestled for Newborn UWF and UWF International in Japan, in a series of matches with Nobuhiko Takada in 1988 and 1989. During his time away from the ring, he coached amateur wrestling at Bacon Academy and Rocky Hill High School in Connecticut.

 Return to WWF (1992–1997, 2000) 
In 1992, Backlund returned to the WWF. During his absence, the WWF had expanded into an international wrestling promotion, due in part to the colorful characters of the "Rock 'n' Wrestling Connection Era", which Hulk Hogan helped to kickstart eight years prior. Backlund, whose persona remained the same as it was in his heyday, seemed to be out of step with the evolution of the WWF. Many fans did not remember him, as he had left just prior to Vince McMahon's national expansion. His initial return to the WWF was largely uneventful and he mainly wrestled mid-card matches. However, at the 1993 Royal Rumble, Backlund, the number two entrant lasted sixty-one minutes and ten seconds, a duration record that stood until 2004, when Chris Benoit broke it. Backlund's first WrestleMania appearance was at WrestleMania IX, where he was quickly pinned by Razor Ramon. Backlund also received several shots at the Intercontinental Championship, then held by Shawn Michaels.

On the July 30, 1994, episode of Superstars, Backlund wrestled what was billed as an "Old Generation vs. New Generation" match with Bret Hart, with Hart's WWF Championship on the line. Over the preceding weeks, the WWF aired vignettes of Backlund training for this match. Hart won the match, capitalizing after Backlund mistakenly believed he had won and helped Hart to his feet. Backlund "snapped" after Hart repeatedly tried to offer a sportsmanlike handshake following the match. He slapped Hart in the face and locked him in the crossface chickenwing submission hold, while screaming hysterically. After finally releasing the hold, Backlund stared at his hands in apparent shock. Backlund then started to regularly "snap" in similar fashion during his matches, viciously attacking his opponent with the crossface chickenwing and refusing to release it after the opponent submitted. He would then seemingly snap back to normal and appear horrified by what he had done.

On an episode of Monday Night Raw, shortly after his match with Hart, Backlund claimed that he should still be considered the legitimate WWF Champion, as he had not been pinned by The Iron Sheik, nor submitted to the camel clutch. Backlund continued wrestling under the new gimmick of an out of touch and highly volatile eccentric, out to teach "The New Generation" a lesson. He dressed in business suits (complete with a bow tie), had a hyperactive personality and used (and often misused, for comic effect) large words during his interviews. He demanded that he be addressed as Mr. Backlund, and he would only sign autographs for wrestling fans if they could recite the names of all of the United States Presidents in chronological order. On several instances, he assaulted wrestlers and other WWF employees and placed them in the crossface chickenwing. These victims include Jim Ross, Duke "The Dumpster" Droese, WWF Magazine writer Lou Gianfriddo, and his former manager Arnold Skaaland, whom he blamed for costing him the WWF World Heavyweight Championship in 1983.

On November 23, 1994, at the Survivor Series pay-per-view in San Antonio, Texas, Backlund faced Bret Hart in a special submission match for the WWF Championship where the only way for a wrestler to win was to have the opponent's valet, like Arnold Skaaland did for Backlund over a decade earlier, stop the match by throwing a towel into the ring. Backlund began displaying a white towel that he claimed was the same one that was thrown into the ring the night he lost to The Iron Sheik. To serve as his second for the match, Backlund paired up with Owen Hart, the brother and chief rival of the reigning champion who had tried and failed multiple times that year to wrest the belt from Bret.

Late in the match, as Backlund was locked in Hart's trademark Sharpshooter submission, Owen entered the ring and attacked Bret from behind to cause him to break the hold. Bret's cornerman for the match, Davey Boy Smith, chased Owen around the ring only to collide head first with the ring stairs. When Bret turned around to argue with his brother, Backlund took advantage and locked the crossface chickenwing on the champion. Hart fought the hold for an unprecedented eight-and-a-half minutes, but refused to give up.

Since Smith was unconscious on the floor, he was unable to save Hart. Owen took advantage by picking up the pink and black towel Smith carried and, feigning concern for the well-being of his brother, approached his father Stu and his mother Helen who were seated at ringside. As Backlund continued to cinch in the crossface chickenwing in the ring, Owen pleaded for his parents to stop the match. Stu refused, not trusting Owen's motives. Helen, however, did not want to see Bret risk further injury and she grabbed the towel and threw it into the ring. Backlund was awarded the championship and celebrated in the ring while Owen rejoiced in finally having cost his brother the championship. After the match, Backlund conducted a brief interview which he concluded by screaming how he felt "like God".

Backlund's second reign as WWF Champion was brief, as he lost the title three days later to Diesel at a non-televised show in Madison Square Garden, the site of many of Backlund's victories in the 1970s and 1980s. Diesel kicked Backlund in the stomach, hit him with a Jackknife Powerbomb and pinned him in eight seconds. For weeks afterwards, fans jeered Backlund with chants of "Eight seconds! Eight seconds!". In a 2005 interview for the Pro Wrestling Torch, Kevin Nash (a.k.a. Diesel) recalled how Backlund sold his Jackknife Powerbomb by crawling up the aisleway, back to the dressing room area of the Garden. Nash said, "He couldn't have put me over any stronger". This match was the last time (to date) the WWF Championship changed hands at a non-televised event, and aside from Money in the Bank cash-ins, this match remains the shortest WWF title match ever; in fact, it would be tied by Randy Orton cashing in his Money in the Bank contract on Daniel Bryan at the 2013 SummerSlam, or Brock Lesnar's quick victory against Kofi Kingston at SmackDown's 20th Anniversary in 2019.

After the title loss, Backlund wrestled progressively less often, never again reaching main event status. One of his final WWF matches was an "I Quit" match against Bret Hart at WrestleMania XI on April 2, 1995 which Backlund lost, even though he never actually said "I quit", instead screaming unintelligibly into the microphone, which special guest referee Roddy Piper seemed to interpret as "I quit".

Following WrestleMania, the WWF ran an angle in which Backlund declared his candidacy for President of the United States. Several vignettes aired, featuring Backlund preaching socially conservative values, and one showed him campaigning at a beach. Backlund also confronted a Bill Clinton impersonator who was seated at ringside at the 1995 Survivor Series. This angle was quietly dropped before it reached a conclusion.

From 1995 to 1996, Backlund went to mid to low card status. He lost to Bret Hart by disqualification on Monday Night Raw on November 21. That would be his last television appearance. He continued to appear in house shows. He lost to Savio Vega in a dark match at In Your House 5 and competed in the Royal Rumble getting eliminated by Yokozuna. This would be his last pay-per-view appearance. His last match was a loss to Savio Vega on May 19 at Madison Square Garden.

From late 1996 to early 1997, Backlund joined forces with his old nemesis, The Iron Sheik, to manage The Sultan in the WWF. He left the WWF shortly after In Your House 14: Revenge of the 'Taker on April 20, where he managed The Sultan in his win over Flash Funk.

In February 1999, Backlund appeared on an episode of Sunday Night Heat in a skit in which himself, The Iron Sheik, and Dominic Denucci gave comedic advice to Mankind before his WWF Championship match with The Rock at St. Valentine's Day Massacre.

Backlund returned to the WWF in the 2000 Royal Rumble. After that, he briefly managed Intercontinental and European Champion Kurt Angle, and he taught his crossface chickenwing submission hold to Angle. Later on, Angle fired Backlund and locked him in that move, after discovering Backlund had booked him in a two-fall triple threat match against Chris Benoit and Chris Jericho (with both of his titles on the line) at WrestleMania 2000, where he ultimately lost both titles. Backlund teamed with Angle on SmackDown! as they lost to Jericho and Tazz by disqualification on March 16.

 Japan and Independent circuit (1994–2001) 
In 1994, Backlund while under contract with WWF worked for Genichiro Tenryu's Wrestle Association R in Japan. He won the WAR World Six-Man Tag Team Championship with Scott Putski and former WWF wrestler The Warlord defeating Fuyuki-Gun members Hiromichi Fuyuki, Gedo and Jado on August 26. They dropped the titles back to Fuyuki, Gedo, and Jado a few days later.

In 1995, while still working for the WWF, Backlund started wrestling on the independent circuit. He mainly wrestled for Windy City Wrestling from 1995 to 1998. He lost to Jimmy Snuka on February 27, 1996 at Trans World Wrestling Federation event. After leaving WWF in 1997, Backlund continued in the indies. On November 11, 1998 he lost to Lance Diamond at NWA New Jersey event.

From 1998 to 1999, he wrestled for Battlarts in Japan. In October 2001 he returned to New Japan Pro-Wrestling teaming with Tatsumi Fujinami for a few matches. He once again retired from wrestling.

 Total Nonstop Action Wrestling (2007) 
After many references to Bob Backlund were made by Kevin Nash, he officially debuted in Total Nonstop Action Wrestling (TNA) in January 2007, at the Final Resolution pay-per-view, judging the finals of the Paparazzi Championship Series (PCS) between Alex Shelley and Austin Starr. Given the tie breaking vote, Backlund launched a long explanation before declaring his decision a draw, and the match was restarted by PCS director Kevin Nash. After Shelley won the match, Starr pie-faced Backlund because he believed Backlund had cost him the match, at which Backlund responded by putting Starr in the crossface chickenwing. At Against All Odds after Senshi defeated Austin Starr, Backlund came out and put his own chickenwing on Starr before dragging him to the back.

Backlund then began to make regular appearances on Impact!. During this time, he was described as crazy and weird by commentators Don West and Mike Tenay, somewhat similar to the "Mr. Backlund" gimmick of his second WWF tenure. At Destination X, Backlund was in the corner of Austin Starr who lost to Senshi in a Crossface Chickenwing match. At Lockdown, Backlund was the special guest referee in a Six Sides of Steel match where Senshi defeated Austin Starr.

Backlund made his in-ring return at Slammiversary, where he defeated Alex Shelley. He then teamed with Jerry Lynn to lose to Alex Shelley and Chris Sabin (managed by Kevin Nash) at Victory Road. When TNA redesigned their website, Backlund's profile was removed, signaling the end of his run with the company.

 Third return to WWE (2007–2017) 
On the 15th Anniversary episode of Raw on December 10, 2007, Backlund participated in the 15th Anniversary battle royal, along with 14 other wrestlers from Raws 15-year history. Backlund was eliminated from the match by Skinner.

On the July 9, 2012, episode of Raw, after Heath Slater's match with Sin Cara, Slater issued a challenge to any "past champion" as part of a weekly series of Legend appearances. Backlund emerged from backstage to answer this challenge and, as Backlund entertained the crowd, Slater kicked him in the stomach and mocked him; Backlund responded by putting Slater in the crossface chickenwing, which he refused to break for 20 seconds after Slater had tapped out. He later appeared on Raw 1000 with all of the other Legends who had faced Slater over prior weeks, helping Lita chase Slater back into the ring when he tried to run away from Lita and the APA.

Backlund was inducted into the WWE Hall of Fame on April 6, 2013, by his friend Maria Menounos, and was acknowledged onstage with the year's other inductees at WrestleMania 29.

Backlund made an appearance on the October 7, 2013, episode of Raw, unsuccessfully attempting to canvass votes in order to become the special guest referee for the WWE Championship match at Hell in a Cell; Shawn Michaels later won a public vote and was named as the special guest referee. However, Backlund did appear in a segment at Hell in a Cell together with The Prime Time Players, where they played WWE 2K14. Since April 2014, he has served as an ambassador for WWE.

On the May 5, 2016, episode of SmackDown, Backlund was asked by Darren Young to be his life coach, and Backlund agreed, vowing to "Make Darren Young Great Again". Over the next several months, various vignettes featuring Young and Backlund aired, with Backlund assuming the role of Young's life coach. On the July 11 episode of Raw, Young won a battle royal to become the number one contender for the Intercontinental Championship. At Battleground, Young faced The Miz in a match that resulted in a double-countout after he applied the Crossface Chickenwing to Miz outside the ring to protect Backlund from Miz and Maryse. On July 19 at the 2016 WWE draft, Backlund and Young were drafted to Raw. In early 2017, after Young got injured, Backlund ceased appearing on television. On October 29, 2017, Young was released from WWE, ending the storyline. Backlund's profile on WWE.com was then moved to the Hall of Fame page shortly afterwards.

 Return to Independent Circuit (2009, 2011) 
On September 21, 2009 Backlund defeated Jason Rumble at NWA On Fire in Springvale, Maine. He would wrestle for Juggalo Championship Wrestling Legends & Icons event defeating Ken Patera on August 12, 2011.

 Dradition Pro Wrestling (2018) 
Backlund at 68 years old returned to Japan. This time for Dradition Pro Wrestling for two events in April 2018. On the 20th he teamed with Riki Choshu and Tatsumi Fujinami to defeat Jinsei Shinzaki, Kazma Sakamoto and Tajiri. Then the next day he teamed with Hiro Saito and Yoshiaki Fujiwara as they lost to Fujinami, Choshu, and Masakatsu Funaki.

 Books 
Backlund's autobiography, The All-American Boy: Lessons and Stories on Life from Wrestling Legend Bob Backlund, was released on September 18, 2015. The 452-page book, contributed to by Robert H. Miller, includes interviews with Roddy Piper, Ric Flair, The Iron Sheik and Vince McMahon.

 Acting career 
Backlund was a guest on MTV's Singled Out, where he acted in sketches with hosts Jenny McCarthy and Chris Hardwick. He played the role of Friar Chuck, alongside Maria Menounos and John Waters, in the feature film comedy In the Land of Merry Misfits. The film played at the 2007 Tribeca Film Festival, where Backlund appeared and signed autographs.

 Personal life 
Backlund and his wife, high school physical education teacher Corki, have a daughter named Carrie. They live in Glastonbury, Connecticut. In 2000, he unsuccessfully ran for a Connecticut seat in Congress on a Republican ticket.

 Championships and accomplishments 

 Championship Wrestling from Florida NWA Florida Tag Team Championship (1 time) – with Steve Keirn
 George Tragos/Lou Thesz Professional Wrestling Hall of Fame Class of 2016
 Georgia Championship Wrestling NWA Georgia Tag Team Championship (1 time) – with Jerry Brisco
 New Japan Pro-Wrestling MSG Tag League (1980) – with Antonio Inoki
Greatest 18 Club inductee
 Northeast Wrestling Federation NEWF Heavyweight Championship (1 time)
 Pro Wrestling Illustrated
 Match of the Year (1978) vs. Superstar Billy Graham on February 20
 Match of the Year (1982) vs. Jimmy Snuka in a steel cage match on June 28
 Most Hated Wrestler of the Year (1994)
 Most Inspirational Wrestler of the Year (1977, 1981)
 Rookie of the Year (1976)
 Wrestler of the Year (1980, 1982)
 Ranked No. 7 of the 500 best singles wrestlers of the PWI Years in 2003
 Professional Wrestling Hall of Fame and Museum
 Modern Era (Class of 2008)
 St. Louis Wrestling Club
 NWA Missouri Heavyweight Championship (1 time)
 Western States Sports
 NWA Western States Heavyweight Championship (3 times)
 World Wide Wrestling Federation/World Wrestling Federation/WWE
WWWF/WWF World Heavyweight Championship (2 times)
 WWF Tag Team Championship (1 time) – with Pedro Morales
 Slammy Award (1 time)
 Most Eccentric (1994)
 WWE Hall of Fame (Class of 2013)
 Wrestling and Romance
 WAR World Six-Man Tag Team Championship (1 time) – with Scott Putski and The Warlord
 Wrestling Observer Newsletter
 Best Technical Wrestler (1980)
 Match of the Year (1980) vs. Ken Patera in a Texas Death match on May 19 in New York City, New York
 Most Disgusting Promotional Tactic (1982) Being WWF Champion
 Most Overrated Wrestler (1983)
 Wrestling Observer Newsletter Hall of Fame (Class of 2004)

References

External links 

 
 
 

1949 births
American catch wrestlers
American male professional wrestlers
American male sport wrestlers
American people of Swedish descent
Connecticut Republicans
Living people
North Dakota State Bison wrestlers
People from Glastonbury, Connecticut
People from Princeton, Minnesota
Professional wrestlers from Minnesota
Professional Wrestling Hall of Fame and Museum
WWE Champions
WWE Hall of Fame inductees
20th-century professional wrestlers
21st-century professional wrestlers
Tenryu Project World 6-Man Tag Team Champions
NWA Florida Tag Team Champions